The 1998 IIHF European U18 Championship was the thirty-first playing of the IIHF European Junior Championships.

Group A
Played April 11 to the 19th in Malung and Mora, Sweden.  The hosts led by twins Daniel and Henrik Sedin, won their tenth European Junior title.

First round 
Group 1

Group 2

Final round
The Czechs had the very unfortunate distinction of finishing tied for first, and actually finishing completely out of the medals.  Coming into the final game against the Russians, the Swedes could lose or tie, and finish fourth, win by one or two goals and finish third, win by three and finish second, or win by four or more and be the champions.  They led five to one after two, and played a scoreless third to clinch gold. 
Championship round

7th place

 No team was relegated, all eight nations were joined by Group B winner, Germany, and the United States to participate in the first IIHF World U18 Championships.

Tournament awards
Top scorer   Daniel Sedin (11 points)
Top goalie:  Kristian Antila
Top defenceman: Mikko Jokela
Top forward:  Daniel Sedin

Group B 
Played April 5 to the 12th in Füssen and Memmingen Germany.  The hosts did not dominate, but still won all their games, to return to the top level.

First round 
Group 1

Group 2

Final round 
Championship round

7th place

Germany was promoted to Group A of the IIHF World U18 Championships.  The remaining seven nations were joined by Group C winner Austria to form Group B of the IIHF World U18 Championships.

Group C
Played March 16 to the 20th in Zagreb, Croatia.  On final day the host Croats had to face Yugoslavia to determine who would be relegated.  Because of the expansion of the top tier to ten teams, it did not matter in the end, but it was a very tense affair at the time.

First round 
Group 1

Group 2

Placing round 

Austria was promoted to Group B of the IIHF World U18 Championships.  No nation was relegated, the remaining Group C nations would take part in Division I of the  1999 U18 European Championships.

Group D 
Played from March 3–9 in Luxembourg.  Two new entrants participated this year, the hosts, and Kazakhstan.  The Kazakhs switched from playing in the Asian junior tournament, to the European.  There was no shadow of a doubt that they were a much better team than was suited for this level, scoring over 150 goals in five games.  The Dutch were the only ones to lose by less than fifteen to the Kazakhs.  Leading the team, a young Nik Antropov scored 54 points.

First round 
Group 1

Group 2

Final round 
Championship round

Placing round

Kazakhstan was promoted to the newly titled Division I of the  1999 U18 European Championships.

References

Complete results

Junior
IIHF European Junior Championship tournament
IIHF European Junior Championship
Sports competitions in Falun
International ice hockey competitions hosted by Sweden
International ice hockey competitions hosted by Germany
Sports competitions in Bavaria
IIHF European U18 Championship
Memmingen
1997–98 in Swedish ice hockey
1997–98 in German ice hockey
IIHF European Junior Championship
International ice hockey competitions hosted by Croatia
IIHF European U18 Championship
1990s in Zagreb
Sports competitions in Zagreb